Many of the divisions and offices of the United States Department of Justice are headed by an assistant attorney general.

The president of the United States appoints individuals to the position of assistant attorney general with the advice and consent of the Senate. United States Department of Justice components that are led by an assistant attorney general are:

Antitrust Division
Civil Division
Civil Rights Division
Criminal Division
National Security Division
Environment and Natural Resources Division (ENRD)
Justice Management Division (JMD)
Tax Division
Office of Justice Programs (OJP)
Office of Legal Counsel (OLC)
Office of Legal Policy (OLP)
Office of Legislative Affairs (OLA)

Assistant attorneys general report either to the deputy attorney general (in the case of the Criminal Division, the Justice Management Division and the Offices of Legal Counsel, Legislative Affairs, and Legal Policy) or to the associate attorney general (in the case of the Antitrust, Civil, Civil Rights, Environment & Natural Resources, and Tax Divisions and the Office of Justice Programs).

List of U.S. Assistant Attorneys General

Assistant Attorney General

Antitrust Division

Civil Division

Civil Rights Division

Kristen Clarke (2021–present)
Eric Dreiband (2018–2021)
John M. Gore (Acting 2017–2018)
Thomas E. Wheeler II (Acting 2017)
 Vanita Gupta (2014–2017)
 Molly J. Moran (Acting 2014)
 Jocelyn Samuels (Acting 2013–2014)
Thomas Perez, (2009–2013)
Grace Chung Becker (Acting 2008)
Wan J. Kim, (2005–2007)
R. Alexander Acosta (2003–2005)
Bradley Schlozman (Acting 2003)
Ralph F. Boyd Jr. (2001–2003)
William R. Yeomans (Acting 2001)
Bill Lann Lee (1997–2001)
Deval Patrick, (1994–1997)
James P. Turner (Acting 1993–94)
John R. Dunne(1990–1993)
James P. Turner (Acting 1989–1990)
William C. Lucas (Acting 1988–1989)
William Bradford Reynolds (1981–1988)
Drew S. Days, III (1977–1980)
J. Stanley Pottinger (1973–1977)
David Luke Norman (1971–1973)
Jerris Leonard (1969–1971)
Stephen J. Pollak (1968–1969)
John Michael Doar (1965 to 1967)
Burke Marshall (1961–1964)
Harold R. Tyler (1960–1961)
W. Wilson White (1957–1960)

Criminal Division

Kenneth Polite (2021–present)
Brian Benczkowski (2018–2020)
Leslie Caldwell (2014–2017)
Lanny Breuer (2009–2013)
Alice Fisher (2005–2008)
Christopher A. Wray (2003–2005)
Michael Chertoff (2001–2003)
James Robinson (1998–2001)
Jo Ann Harris (1993–1995)
Robert Mueller (1990–1993)
Edward S.G. Dennis (1988–1990)
William Weld (1986–1988)
Stephen S. Trott (1983–1986)
D. Lowell Jensen (1981–1983)
Philip Heymann (1978–1981)
Benjamin Civiletti (1977–1978)
Dick Thornburgh (1975–1977)
Henry E. Petersen (1972–1974)
Will Wilson (1969–1971)
Fred Vinson Jr. (1965–1969)
Herbert Miller Jr. (1961–1965)
Malcolm R. Wilkey (1959–1961)
Malcolm Anderson (1958–1959)
Warren Olney III (1953–1957)
Charles B. Murray (1952–1953)
James M. McInerney (1950–1952)
Alexander M. Campbell (1948–1949)
T. Vincent Quinn (1947–1948)
Theron Caudle (1945–1947)
Tom C. Clark (1943–1945)
Wendell Berge (1940–1943)
O. John Rogge (1939–1940)
Brien McMahon (1936–1939)
Joseph B. Keenan (1934–1936)
Pat Malloy (1933)
E. Nugent Dodds (1931–1933)
Oscar R. Luhring (1925–1930)
William J. Donovan (1924–1925)
Earl J. Davis (1924)
John Crim (1921–1923)
Robert P. Stewart (1919–1921)

National Security Division

Environment and Natural Resources Division
Ramsey Clark (1961–1965) Lands Division
Jeffrey Clark (2018–2021)
Todd Kim (2021–present)

Justice Management Division
Lee J. Lofthus

Tax Division
Robert H. Jackson (1936–1938)
Mabel Walker Willebrandt (1921–1929)

Office of Justice Programs
Laurie O. Robinson

Office of Legal Counsel

Office of Legal Policy
Viet D. Dinh (2001–2003)
Daniel J. Bryant (2003–2005)
Rachel Brand (2005–2007)
Elisebeth C. Cook (2008–2009)
Christopher H. Schroeder (2010–2012)
Beth Ann Williams (2017–2020)
Hampton Dellinger (2021–present)

Office of Legislative Affairs
 Carlos Uriarte (August 2022 - Present)
 Peter Hyun (November 2021 – August 2022; acting)
 Helaine Greenfeld (January 2021 – November 2021; acting)
 Stephen Boyd (August 2017 – January 2021)
 Peter J. Kadzik (June 2014 – January 2017)
 Judith C. Appelbaum (June 13, 2012–?)
 Ronald H. Weich (April 29, 2009 – April 25, 2012)
 Richard Hertling (2003–2007)
 Daniel J. Bryant (2001–2003)
 Robert Raben (1999–2001)
 Jon Jennings Acting (1998–1999)
 L. Anthony Sutin (1998)
 John R. Bolton (1985–1989)
 Robert A. McConnell (1981–1985)
 Patricia Wald (1977–1979)
 Michael Uhlmann (1975–1977)
 Mitch McConnell (1975, acting)
 W. Vincent Rakestraw (March 3, 1974 – February 1, 1975)
 Mike McKevitt (1973)

References

 
Assistant Attorney General
Attorney General, assistant